Bruno Snell (18 June 1896 – 31 October 1986) was a German classical philologist. From 1931 to 1959 he held a chair for classical philology at the University of Hamburg where he established the Thesaurus Linguae Graecae research centre in 1944.

Biography
After studying law and economics at University of Edinburgh and University of Oxford, Snell gained interest in classical studies and finally changed his major to classical philology. He earned his Ph.D. from the University of Göttingen in 1922.

Snell served as the inaugural president of the Mommsen Society from 1950 to 1954. In 1953, the Europa-Kolleg Hamburg, an institution promoting research and postgraduate education in the field of European integration, was founded on Snell's initiative.  Since 1989, the Mommsen Society awards the Bruno Snell Prize to young classical scholars.

His book, The Discovery of the Mind: The Greek Origins of European Thought (Die Entdeckung des Geistes, Hamburg, 1946, trans. T.G. Rosenmeyer, 1953) argues that the development of Greek literature from Homer to Aristophanes and Plato shows a gradual self-discovery of an inner mental life.  It argues that the Greek culture developed a unique and individual inner world of thought for humans, before which was not available.  This is similar to later psychological theories of the development and evolution of human consciousness.

Decorations and awards
Snell was a member of the Academies of Sciences of Göttingen, Munich, Vienna, Copenhagen, the German Academy for Language and Literature as well as of PEN International.

 1976 Austrian Medal for Science and Art
 1977 Pour le Mérite for Arts and Sciences

Further reading
.

External links

Europa-Kolleg Hamburg profile of Bruno Snell

1896 births
1986 deaths
People from Hildesheim
German classical scholars
Alumni of the University of Edinburgh
Alumni of the University of Oxford
University of Göttingen alumni
Academic staff of the University of Hamburg
German philologists
Knights Commander of the Order of Merit of the Federal Republic of Germany
Recipients of the Austrian Decoration for Science and Art
Recipients of the Pour le Mérite (civil class)
Members of the German Academy of Sciences at Berlin
Corresponding Fellows of the British Academy
20th-century philologists